"Lucky Like That" is a song by English girl group Clea, released in June 2006 as their fourth and final single in the UK. It was a minor hit, reaching No. 55 on the UK Singles Chart.

The song appears on their UK debut album, Trinity.

Charts

References

2006 songs
2006 singles
Clea (group) songs
Song articles with missing songwriters